Kannauj railway station is a railway station in Kannauj district, Uttar Pradesh. Its code is KJN. It will serve Kannauj city. The station has two platforms.

Trains 

 Utsarg Express
 Kalindi Express
 Kanpur Central–Kasganj Express
 Farrukhabad–Kanpur Anwarganj Express
 Chhapra–Mathura Superfast Express
 Ahmedabad–Gorakhpur Express
 Jaipur–Lucknow Express
 Kanpur Central–Anand Vihar Terminal Express
 Kolkata–Agra Cantonment Express
 Bandra Terminus–Lucknow Weekly Express
 Ahmedabad–Lucknow Weekly Express
 Kanpur Central–Bandra Terminus Weekly Express
 Udaipur City–Patliputra Humsafar Express

References

Izzatnagar railway division
Railway stations in Kannauj district